The Manitoba order of precedence is a nominal and symbolic hierarchy of important positions within the province of Manitoba. It has no legal standing but is used to dictate ceremonial protocol at events of a provincial nature.

 The King of Canada (His Majesty Charles III)
 Lieutenant Governor of Manitoba  (Anita Neville)
 President of the Executive Council, otherwise known as the Premier of Manitoba (Heather Stefanson)
 Chief Justice of Manitoba (Richard J. F. Chartier)
 Former Lieutenant Governors of Manitoba in order of seniority of taking office
 Pearl McGonigal,  (1981–1986)
 Yvon Dumont,  (1993–1999)
 Philip S. Lee,  (2009–2015)
 Janice Filmon,  (2015–2022)
 Former Presidents of the Executive Council of Manitoba in order of seniority in taking office
 Edward Schreyer,  (1969–1977)
 Gary Filmon,  (1988–1999)
 Gary Doer,  (1999–2009)
 Greg Selinger,  (2009–2016)
 Brian Pallister, (2016–2021)
 Kelvin Goertzen, (2021)
Members of the King's Privy Council for Canada residing in Manitoba by order of seniority of taking the Oath of Office
 Otto Lang,  (1968)
 Jake Epp,  (1979)
 Lloyd Axworthy,  (1980)
 Jack Murta,  (1984)
 Charles Mayer,  (1984)
 Jon Gerrard,  (1993)
 Rey Pagtakhan,  (2001)
 Raymond Simard,  (2004)
 Vic Toews,  (2006)
 Steven Fletcher,  (2008)
 Shelly Glover,  (2013)
 Candice Bergen,  (2013)
 Members of the Executive Council of Manitoba in relative order of seniority of appointment
 Steve Ashton,  (1999)
 Dave Chomiak,  (1999)
 Gord Mackintosh,  (1999)
 Eric Robinson,  (1999)
 Ron Lemieux,  (1999)
 Stan Struthers,  (1999)
 Peter Bjornson,  (2003)
 Theresa Oswald,  (2004)
 Kerri Irvin-Ross,  (2006)
 Andrew Swan,  (2008)
 Jennifer Howard,  (2009)
 Flor Marcelino,  (2009)
 Erin Selby,  (2011)
 Kevin Chief,  (2012)
 Ron Kostyshyn,  (2012)
 Sharon Blady,  (2013)
 Erna Braun,  (2013)
 James Allum,  (2013)
 Chief Justice of the Court of King's Bench of Manitoba (Glenn Joyal)
 Speaker of the Legislative Assembly of Manitoba (Myrna Driedger)
 Puisne Judges of the Court of Appeal and of the Court of King's Bench in relative order of seniority of appointment
 Robert Carr (1983; supernumerary since 2006)
 Michel Monnin (1984)
 Kenneth R. Hanssen (1984; supernumerary since 2008)
 Kris Stefanson (1988; supernumerary since 2008)
 Rodney Mykle (1989; supernumerary since 2007)
 Gerry Mercier,  (1989; supernumerary since 2009)
 Robyn Diamond (1989; supernumerary since 2011)
 Jeffrey Oliphant (1990; supernumerary since 2008)
 Albert Clearwater (1992; supernumerary since 2007)
 Alan MacInnes (1992; supernumerary since 2010)
 Holly C. Beard (1992)
 Perry Schulman,  (1993; supernumerary since 2008)
 Barbara Hamilton,  (1995)
 Freda Steel (1995)
 Brenda Keyser (1995)
 John A. Menzies (1996)
 Marc M. Monnin (1997)
 Deborah McCawley,  (1997)
 Donald Little,  (1998)
 Morris Kaufman (1998; supernumerary since 2010)
 Laurie Allen,  (1998)
 Douglas Yard,  (1998)
 Donald Bryk,  (1999)
 Frank Aquila (2000)
 Robert B. Doyle (2000)
 Murray Sinclair (2001)
 Joan McKelvey (2001)
 Martin Freedman,  (2002)
 Colleen Suche,  (2002)
 Marilyn Goldberg,  (2002)
 Shawn Greenberg (2003)
 Karen Simonsen (2004)
 Marianne Rivoalen (2005)
 Lori Spivak (2005)
 Lori Douglas (2005)
 A. Catherine Everett (2006)
 Michael Thomson (2007)
 Douglas Abra,  (2007)
 Brian Midwinter,  (2008)
 Robert G. Cummings (2008)
 Joan MacPhail,  (2009)
 Chris W. Martin (2009)
 William Johnston (2009)
 William J. Burnett,  (2009)
 Robert A. Dewar,  (2009)
 Rick Saull (2010)
 Gerald L. Chartier (2010)
 Diana M. Cameron (2011)
 Shane Perlmutter (2011)
 Herbert Rempel (2011)
 Leader of the Opposition in the Legislative Assembly (Wab Kinew)
 Archbishop of St. Boniface (Albert LeGatt)
 Bishop of Rupert's Land (Geoffrey Woodcroft)
 Archbishop of Winnipeg (Richard Gagnon)
 Metropolitan of the Ukrainian Orthodox Church
 Metropolitan of the Ukrainian Catholic Church (Lawrence Daniel Huculak, OSBM)
 Chairman of the Manitoba Conference of the United Church of Canada (Barb Jardine)
 Chairman of the Manitoba Conference of the Presbyterian Church in Canada
 Chairman or other representative persons of the following denominations as indicated below and whose person will be signified to the Clerk of the Executive Council from time to time: 
 Lutheran Church 
 Jewish Rabbi 
 The Mennonite faith 
 The Baptist Church 
 The Salvation Army 
 The Pastors Evangelical Fellowship 
 Members of the House of Commons residing in Manitoba by order of seniority in taking office
 James Bezan,  (2004)
 Niki Ashton,  (2008)
 Kevin Lamoureux,  (2010)
 Ted Falk,  (2013)
 Larry Maguire,  (2013)
 Members of the Legislative Assembly
 Jon Gerrard, 
 Ron Schuler, 
 Ralph Eichler, 
 Leanne Rowat, 
 Cliff Cullen, 
 Blaine Pedersen, 
 Matt Wiebe, 
 Wayne Ewasko, 
 Cameron Friesen, 
 Reg Helwer, 
 Jim Maloway, 
 Dennis Smook, 
 Ian Wishart, 
 Shannon Martin, 
 County Court Judges in relative order of seniority of appointment 
 Magistrates in relative order of seniority of appointment 
 Members of the local consular corps in relative order of seniority of appointment 
 Mayors, Reeves and local government administrators in relative order of date of taking office

References

 
 

Manitoba